Clerke is a tiny lunar impact crater named after Irish astronomer Agnes Mary Clerke, who played a role in bringing astronomy and astrophysics to the public in Victorian England. It is located near the eastern edge of Mare Serenitatis in the midst of a rille system named the Rimae Littrow after the crater Littrow to the east. It is roughly circular and cup-shaped, with a relatively high albedo. In a valley to the southeast is the landing site of the Apollo 17 mission. Clerke was previously designated Littrow B.

See also 
 Asteroid 9583 Clerke

References

External links
Closeup of Clerke by Lunar Orbiter 5
 LTO-42C2 Clerke — L&PI topographic map.

Impact craters on the Moon